Renanthera bella is a species of orchid.  This orchid is only known from Mount Kinabalu in Malaysian Borneo.

References

External links 
 
 

bella
Epiphytes
Endemic flora of Borneo
Orchids of Borneo
Flora of Sabah
Plants described in 1981
Flora of Mount Kinabalu